Hardwicke is a civil parish in Northumberland County, New Brunswick, Canada.

For governance purposes it is part of the Greater Miramichi and Kent rural districts, which are members of the Greater Miramichi Regional Service Commission and Kent RSC respectively.

Prior to the 2023 governance reform, the parish was divided between the local service districts of Baie Ste. Anne, Black River-Hardwicke, Escuminac, and the parish of Hardwicke. The reforms put Black River-Hardwicke and the Miramichi Bay islands of the parish LSD in the Greater Miramichi rural district, with the remainder going to Kent.

Origin of name
The parish may have been named in honour of the Earl of Hardwicke, a prominent commander in the Royal Navy at the time of its erection.

More frequently cited as the honouree is Benjamin Hardwick, a contributor to Church of England missions in the area; the extra letter in the name would then be due to clerical error.

History
Hardwicke was erected in 1852 from the eastern part of Glenelg Parish.

Boundaries
Hardwicke Parish is bounded:

 on the north by Bay du Vin, Miramichi Inner Bay, Miramichi Bay, and the Gulf of Saint Lawrence;
 on the east by the Gulf of Saint Lawrence;
 on the south by the Kent County line;
 on the west by a line, beginning on the county line at a point about 3.1 kilometres northeasterly of Hells Gate Lake, on the prolongation of the southwestern line of a Little Black River grant to Duncan McNaughton, then running northwesterly along the prolongation and the McNaughton grant to strike Little Black River at a point about 125 metres upstream of the Little Branch Road bridge, then down the Little Black River to its mouth, down the Big Black River to its mouth, and out into Bay du Vin;
 including Bay du Vin Island, Fox Island, and smaller islands in front of the parish.

Evolution of boundaries
When Hardwicke was erected the Kent County line at its eastern end ran from Point Escuminac through land, then the waters of Northumberland Strait, then through land again, leaving a small piece of Kent County isolated from the rest.

In 1888 this fragment of Kent County was transferred to Hardwicke.

Communities
Communities at least partly within the parish.

 Auburnville
  Baie-Sainte-Anne
  Bay du Vin
 Bay du Vin Beach
 Eel River Bridge
  Escuminac
 Gregan
 Hardwicke
 Hardwood Settlement
 Hortons Creek
 Manuels
 Miramichi
 Point Gardiner

Bodies of water
Bodies of water at least partly within the parish.

 Bay du Vin River
  Black River
 Eel River
 French River
 Little Black River
 Portage River
 Dennis Creek
 Hortons Creek
 Robichaud Creek
 Gulf of St. Lawrence
 Bay du Vin
 Miramichi Bay
 Baie Sainte-Anne
 Bay du Vin Harbour

Islands
Islands at least partly within the parish.
 Bay du Vin Island
 Egg Island
 Fox Island
 Huckleberry Island

Other notable places
Parks, historic sites, and other noteworthy places at least partly within the parish.
 Bay du Vin Island Protected Natural Area

Demographics

Population
Population trend

Language
Mother tongue (2016)

See also
List of parishes in New Brunswick

Notes

References

Parishes of Northumberland County, New Brunswick
Local service districts of Northumberland County, New Brunswick